James Allum  is a Canadian politician, who was elected to the Legislative Assembly of Manitoba in the 2011 election. He represented the electoral district of Fort Garry-Riverview as a member of the New Democratic Party of Manitoba caucus.

On November 3, 2014, Allum was appointed as Minister of Justice after then-minister Andrew Swan, along with four other ministers, resigned from cabinet over concerns about Premier Greg Selinger's leadership.

He announced in late 2018 that he would not run in the next provincial election (which was expected in 2020 but held in 2019 instead), wherein Fort Garry-Riverview was due to be abolished by electoral redistribution. Allum is the only MLA for Fort Garry-Riverview.

Electoral record

References

External links
 

Living people
New Democratic Party of Manitoba MLAs
Politicians from Winnipeg
Members of the Executive Council of Manitoba
21st-century Canadian politicians
Year of birth missing (living people)